Nurzyna  is a village in the administrative district of Gmina Trzebieszów, within Łuków County, Lublin Voivodeship, in eastern Poland.

The village has an approximate population of 400.

References

Nurzyna